Correlazione is a ballet made by Miriam Mahdaviani for New York City Ballet's Diamond Project II to Corelli's concerti grossi, Op. 6, No. 1 in D major, No. 3 in C minor, No. 8 in G minor (Christmas Concerto), and to the Sonata for Violin Op. 5, No. 12 in D minor (La follia). The premiere took place 26 May 1994 at the New York State Theater, Lincoln Center.

Original cast 
  
Yvonne Borree
Jenifer Ringer
 
Albert Evans
Arch Higgins

Articles 
May 15, 1994 article by Jennifer Dunning, The New York Times

Reviews 

  
May 28, 1994 review by Anna Kisselgoff, The New York Times
January 25, 1995 review by Anna Kisselgoff, The New York Times

 
May 28, 1996 review by Jack Anderson, The New York Times
January 14, 1997 review by Jack Anderson, The New York Times
May 6, 2002 review by Anna Kisselgoff, The New York Times

Ballets by Miriam Mahdaviani
Ballets to the music of Arcangelo Corelli
1994 ballet premieres
New York City Ballet repertory
New York City Ballet Diamond Project